Detailed list of the finalists of the America's Cup.

See also
 America's Cup
 Defender (America's Cup)
 Challenger (America's Cup)

References

External links 
 Herreshoff Marine Museum — America's Cup Hall of Fame

Lists of ships